Ibrahim Mahmoud Hamad (born January 1956) is a Sudanese politician of the National Congress Party, who governed Kassala State from 2006 until 2008, whereupon he adopted the position of Minister of the Interior in the Ministry of Interior Affairs. He is noted for his liaison with United Nations peacekeeping forces in Sudan, and the 2009 Sudanese nomadic conflicts. Following the April 2019 Sudanese coup, Hamad lost his position as Minister of Interior. The former Interior Minister was arrested on April 14, 2019 for his role in the crackdown of people protested the rule of former President Omar al-Bashir.

Notes

Living people
National Congress Party (Sudan) politicians
Government ministers of Sudan
People from Kassala (state)
1956 births